This is a list of transfers involving Super Rugby teams between the end of the 2012 Super Rugby season and the end of the 2013 Super Rugby season.

Players listed are all players that were named in the initial senior squad, or subsequently included in a 22-man matchday squad at any game during the season.

(did not play) denotes that a player did not play at all during one of the two seasons due to injury or non-selection. These players are included to indicate they remained attached to the team.

(short-term) denotes that a player wasn't initially contracted, but came in during the season. This could either be a club rugby player coming in during an injury crisis or a player whose contract expired at another team, typically in the northern hemisphere.

Australian and New Zealand teams will name their squads (typically containing 30 players). They can also name additional players that usually serve as backup or development players for the franchises. These players are denoted by (wider training group) (New Zealand teams) or (extended playing squad) (Australian teams) below. In South Africa, all teams have affiliated domestic teams playing in the local Vodacom Cup competition.

Players might be used in different positions, but will be listed in their most common positions during the two seasons.

Flags are only shown for international transfers.

Australia

Brumbies

‡ Jono Owen was released by the Brumbies during the season and joined the Rebels on a short-term deal.

Force

Rebels

Reds

Waratahs

New Zealand

Blues

Chiefs

Crusaders

Highlanders

Hurricanes

South Africa

Bulls

Cheetahs

Kings
The Kings joined the 2013 Super Rugby season at the expense of the Lions. All players joined from  unless stated.

Lions
The Lions will be replaced in the 2013 Super Rugby season by the Kings. All players returned to the domestic  team unless stated.

Sharks

Stormers

See also
 2012 Super Rugby season
 2013 Super Rugby season
 List of 2013–14 Super Rugby transfers

References

2012-13
2012 Super Rugby season
2013 Super Rugby season